Naphrys xerophila is a species of jumping spider. It is found in Florida and Georgia in the southeastern United States. It is usually found in leaf litter in xeric (dry) habitats. Adults measure between 2 and 4 mm in length, females being on average larger than males.

References

Salticidae
Articles created by Qbugbot
Spiders described in 1981